The 1971–72 South Pacific cyclone season, unlike the previous two, was an average season, featuring eleven tropical disturbances, eleven tropical cyclones, and six severe tropical cyclones. The season began only four days after the official start, November 1, and ended very late, on June 5, more than a month after the official end of the season, April 30.


Systems

Tropical Cyclone SP7101

This tropical cyclone existed from November 5-12. However, it didn't have a name.

Severe Tropical Cyclone Ursula

Cyclone Ursula existed from 2 to 16 December 1971 in the Solomon Islands region.

Tropical Cyclone Vivienne

Tropical Cyclone Vivienne existed from December 16-19. It became a Category 1 tropical cyclone ( equivalent to a tropical storm ) on its peak intensity.

Tropical Cyclone Althea

Severe Tropical Cyclone Carlotta

Tropical Cyclone SP7102

Severe Tropical Cyclone Wendy

Cyclone Wendy was a very intense tropical cyclone that existed from 30 January to 9 February 1972 off the coast of Queensland.

Severe Tropical Cyclone Yolande

Severe Tropical Cyclone Agatha

Severe Tropical Cyclone Gail

Cyclone Gail existed from 11 to 18 April 1972 well off of the coast of Queensland.

Cyclone Ida

Cyclone Ida existed from 30 May to 3 June 1972 near the Solomon Islands. It caused $70 million  in damage.

See also

Atlantic hurricane seasons: 1971, 1972
Eastern Pacific hurricane seasons: 1971, 1972
Western Pacific typhoon seasons: 1971, 1972
North Indian Ocean cyclone seasons: 1971, 1972

References

External links

 
South Pacific cyclone seasons